There are at least 181 named trails in Flathead County, Montana according to the U.S. Geological Survey, Board of Geographic Names.  A trail is defined as: "Route for passage from one point to another; does not include roads or highways (jeep trail, path, ski trail)."

 Aeneas Creek Trail, el.  
 Akokala Lake Trail, el.  
 Alpine Trail, el.  
 Alpinglow Alley Ski Trail, el.  
 Ashley Divide Trail, el.  
 Autumn Creek Trail, el.  
 Avalanche Trail, el.  
 Bad Rock Ski Trail, el.  
 Baptiste Lookout Trail, el.  
 Bar Z Trail, el.  
 Barndance Ski Trail, el.  
 Battery Mountain Trail, el.  
 Beargrass Ski Trail, el.  
 Bench Run Ski Trail, el.  
 Big Face Ski Trail, el.  
 Big Ravine Ski Trail, el.  
 Big River Trail, el.  
 Bighorn Ski Trail, el.  
 Black Bear Ski Trail, el.  
 Boulder Pass Trail, el.  
 Boundary Trail, el.  
 Bowl Divide Trail, el.  
 Bowman Lake Trail, el.  
 Bungalow Lookout Trail, el.  
 Calbick Creek Trail, el.  
 Camas Creek Trail, el.  
 Caribou Ski Trail, el.  
 Castle Rock Trail, el.  
 Cedarview Ski Trail, el.  
 Chair Mountain Trail, el.  
 Chipmunk Ski Trail, el.  
 Coal Creek Fire Trail, el.  
 Columbia Mountain Trail, el.  
 Connies Coulee Ski Trail, el.  
 Corkscrew Ski Trail, el.  
 Cut Bank Pass Trail, el.  
 Danny on Memorial National Recreation Trail, el.  
 Devil Creek Trail, el.  
 Dirtyface-Logan Creek Trail, el.  
 Doris Creek Trail, el.  
 East Rim Face Ski Trail, el.  
 East Rim Ski Trail, el.  
 Edna Creek Trail, el.  
 Eds Run Ski Trail, el.  
 Elkweed Ski Trail, el.  
 Evans Heaven Ski Trail, el.  
 Expressway Ski Trail, el.  
 Fault One Ski Trail, el.  
 Fault Three Ski Trail, el.  
 Fault Two Ski Trail, el.  
 Felix Basin Trail, el.  
 Fielding Coal Creek Fire Trail, el.  
 Fielding Coal Creek Trail, el.  
 Flattop Mountain Trail, el.  
 Fort Steele Trail, el.  
 Georges Gorge Ski Trail, el.  
 Giefer Twentyfive Mile Creek Trail, el.  
 Goat Haunt Ski Trail, el.  
 Good Medicine Ski Trail, el.  
 Granite Creek Trail, el.  
 Granite Park Trail, el.  
 Granite-Morrison Trail, el.  
 Grant Ridge Trail, el.  
 Graves Creek Trail, el.  
 Gray Wolf Ski Trail, el.  
 Grays Golf Course Ski Trail, el.  
 Green Mountain Trail, el.  
 Griffin Creek Trail, el.  
 Griffin Creek Trail, el.  
 Gunsight Pass Trail, el.  
 Gunsight Trail, el.  
 Haileys Ski Trail, el.  
 Harris Ridge Trail, el.  
 Haskill Slide Ski Trail, el.  
 Head Wall Ski Trail, el.  
 Heaven Ski Trail, el.  
 Heep Steep Ski Trail, el.  
 Helen Creek Trail, el.  
 Hell Fire Ski Trail, el.  
 Hellroaring Ski Trail, el.  
 Hibernation Ski Trail, el.  
 Highline Trail, el.  
 Hogans East Ski Trail, el.  
 Hogans Ski Trail, el.  
 Home Again Ski Trail, el.  
 Hope Slope Ski Trail, el.  
 Howe Lake Trail, el.  
 Huckleberry Patch Ski Trail, el.  
 Inspiration Ski Trail, el.  
 Interstate Ski Trail, el.  
 Jimmie Ridge Trail, el.  
 Kodiak Ski Trail, el.  
 Langley Ski Trail, el.  
 Larch Hill Trail, el.  
 Larch Ski Trail, el.  
 Lincoln Lake Trail, el.  
 Lion Creek Trail, el.  
 Lodgepole Creek Trail, el.  
 Logan Creek Trail, el.  
 Loneman Mountain Trail, el.  
 Lower Mullys Ski Trail, el.  
 Lupine Lake Trail, el.  
 Marmot Ski Trail, el.  
 McDonald Creek Trail, el.  
 Meadow Creek Trail, el.  
 Micho Trail, el.  
 Middle Fork Ski Trail, el.  
 Miner Creek Trail, el.  
 Moe Mentum Ski Trail, el.  
 Moose Ski Trail, el.  
 Mount Bradley Trail, el.  
 Mount Brown Lookout Trail, el.  
 Mountain Meadow Trail, el.  
 Movieland Ski Trail, el.  
 Mule Creek Trail, el.  
 Mule Ridge Trail, el.  
 Murr Peak Trail, el.  
 Murray Canyon Trail, el.  
 Muskrat Creek Trail, el.  
 No Name Ski Trail, el.  
 Noisy Creek Notch Trail, el.  
 North Bowl Face Ski Trail, el.  
 Numa Ridge Lookout Trail, el.  
 Oettiker Creek Trail, el.  
 Ole Creek Trail, el.  
 Ousel Peak Trail, el.  
 Paint Creek Trail, el.  
 Park Creek Trail, el.  
 Pentagon Clack Creek Trail, el.  
 Picnic Chutes Ski Trail, el.  
 Pioneer Ridge Trail, el.  
 Pitamakan Pass Trail, el.  
 Powder Bowl Ski Trail, el.  
 Powder Trap Ski Trail, el.  
 Ptarmigan Bowl Ski Trail, el.  
 Quartz Lake Trail, el.  
 QuestionMark Ski Trail, el.  
 Ralph Thayer Memorial Trail, el.  
 Red Plume Trail, el.  
 Reid Divide Trail, el.  
 Russ Street Ski Trail, el.  
 Satans Abyss Ski Trail, el.  
 Satans Traverse Ski Trail, el.  
 Schmidts Chute Ski Trail, el.  
 Sheep Creek Trail, el.  
 Short Cut Ski Trail, el.  
 Silvertip Ski Trail, el.  
 Ski Way Ski Trail, el.  
 Skyland-Morrison Creek Trail, el.  
 Skyland-Puzzle Creek Trail, el.  
 Slalom Ski Trail, el.  
 Sling Shot Ski Trail, el.  
 Smith Creek Trail, el.  
 Snake Creek Loop, el.  
 Snyder Lake Trail, el.  
 Snyder Ridge Trail, el.  
 South Boundary Trail, el.  
 Spotted Bear Mountain Trail, el.  
 Spotted Bear River Trail, el.  
 Spotted Bear Schafer Trail, el.  
 Spruce Park Moose Lake Trail, el.  
 Spy Mountain Trail, el.  
 Summit Trail, el.  
 Sunrise Loop Ski Trail, el.  
 Surprise Pass Trail, el.  
 Swift Creek Ski Trail, el.  
 Tally Mountain Billy Creek Trail, el.  
 Teepee Ski Trail, el.  
 Three Stooges Ski Trail, el.  
 Threetops Trail, el.  
 Tongue Mountain Trail, el.  
 Toni Matt Ski Trail, el.  
 Two Way Ski Trail, el.  
 Upper Mullys Ski Trail, el.  
 West Dawson Pass Trail, el.  
 West Lakes Trail, el.  
 White River Trail, el.  
 Whitefish Divide-Smokey Range National Recreation Trail, el.  
 Whitetail Ski Trail, el.  
 Wolf Creek Trail, el.  
 Wood Lot Ski Trail, el.

Further reading

See also
 List of trails of Montana
 Trails of Yellowstone National Park

Notes

Geography of Flathead County, Montana
 Flathead County
Transportation in Flathead County, Montana